Wayne Gretzky's 3D Hockey is a video game developed and published by Atari Games for the arcade in 1996. A port for the Nintendo 64 console was released almost simultaneously with the arcade version, on November 11, 1996, making it the first-ever 4-player game for the Nintendo 64, beating Mario Kart's Japanese release by more than a month. The game was followed by a sequel, Wayne Gretzky's 3D Hockey '98 (also ported to the PlayStation, and used as the basis for Olympic Hockey Nagano '98).

Gameplay
As opposed to the more realistic ice hockey simulation gameplay seen in Electronic Arts' NHL series, Wayne Gretzky's 3D Hockey features arcade-style gameplay, with moves such as "power saves", which cause the goaltender to briefly transform into a brick wall, "power shots", which set the net on fire or knock the goalie into the net, and "power checks", which send an ambulance across the top of the screen. It features high-scoring games and over-the-top fights. There is also a simulation mode for those looking for more realistic gameplay. The game allowed the creation of profiles and would keep track of important individual and team stats, including goals, assists, and wins, among others.

Development
Wayne Gretzky's 3D Hockey was the second game to result from a three-year deal for a line of signature video games featuring hockey star Wayne Gretzky, the first being Wayne Gretzky and the NHLPA All-Stars.

The skating animations were created by videotaping Gretzky skating from different angles and building a 3D model to imitate his movements. The arcade hardware was built around the Voodoo Graphics chip.

The arcade game could be purchased as a dedicated cabinet or as a JAMMA-compatible conversion kit.

It was announced that the Nintendo 64 version would include fatalities after the fights, but Midway Games removed them from the final version.

Reception

Next Generation hailed Wayne Gretzky's 3D Hockey as "an arcade hockey game against which to measure others." Though the reviewer suspected that the Nintendo 64 version's being released less than a month after the arcade version would prevent the game from achieving success in the arcades, he lauded the realistic physics, multiple play modes, comprehensive licensing, statistics tracking, and selection of moves. He also noted that the "Burst" button prevents situations where the puck gets out of reach for extended periods of time, ensuring continuous action.

Most reviews for the Nintendo 64 version were mixed, generally praising the polygonal graphics and overall accurate recreation of the arcade version, but remarking that while the game is great fun with four players, the mediocre A.I. makes it impossible to enjoy in single-player mode. Most critics noted that while there is a simulation mode, it does not effectively translate the game into a realistic hockey sim, making it a disappointment to the hardcore hockey fan base. For some critics this was the game's key problem; GamePro, for example, concluded, "If fast, simple hockey appeals to you and your buds, Gretzky's there with all the right bells and whistles. Just don't expect the depth and staying power of EA's NHL series or Sony's Faceoff '97." Next Generation similarly said, "Fanatical hockey fans will be disappointed, as more realistic and finer-tuned hockey games on other systems easily outdo this one ... but more action-hungry players will find Gretzky worth the money, if only because its multiplayer capabilities are a blast, the arcade mode is fast, and the fights, well, they just come with the territory." However, GameSpots Tom Ham did not consider the lack of a true simulation option to be a problem at all, and concluded, "No more slower frame rates, small players, and limited perspectives: 64-bit action is here and boy what fun it is."

Both Tom Ham and GamePro criticized the audio commentary as being too repetitive, while Joe Rybicki of Electronic Gaming Monthly found it impressive for a cartridge-based game to have an announcer at all.

See also 
Wayne Gretzky Hockey
Hit the Ice
NHL Open Ice

References

External links
Wayne Gretzky's 3D Hockey at MobyGames
Wayne Gretzky's 3D Hockey at the Killer List of Videogames

1996 video games
Arcade video games
Atari arcade games
Ed Logg games
Ice hockey video games
Midway video games
Nintendo 64 games
Video games developed in the United States
3D Hockey
Williams video games